John James "Jack" Caffery (June 30, 1934 — December 2, 1992) was a Canadian professional ice hockey player who played 57 games in the National Hockey League for the Toronto Maple Leafs and Boston Bruins during the 1950s. Jack was the brother of the hockey player Terry Caffery.

Career statistics

Regular season and playoffs

External links
 
 

1934 births
1992 deaths
Boston Bruins players
Canadian ice hockey centres
Greensboro Generals (EHL) players
Ice hockey people from Ontario
Pittsburgh Hornets players
Springfield Indians players
Sportspeople from Kingston, Ontario
Toronto Maple Leafs players
Toronto St. Michael's Majors players